This list will include all comic books that have been or will be released on CD-ROM or DVD-ROM, as well as what books are included in each release. The majority of these releases have been produced or co-produced by Graphic Imaging Technology (GIT), with most of those releases containing Marvel comic books. In addition to these "authorized" editions there are also limitless "unauthorized" publishers offering these titles and many more. Most comic books have already been converted to digital format.

List

CD DVD
DVD